Al Hassan Toure (born 30 May 2000) is a professional soccer player who plays as a forward for Macarthur FC in the A-League. Born a Liberian refugee in Guinea, he has represented Australia at youth level. 

Toure is eligible to represent Australia, Guinea and Liberia at national level. Toure was called up to the Australia national under-23 soccer team squad on 11 November 2019 for a series of friendlies against U-23 teams in Chongqing, China later that month.

Club career

Adelaide United
On 7 August 2019, Toure made his professional debut against Melbourne Knights in the 2019 FFA Cup, scoring the opening goal as Adelaide won the match 5–2. Soon afterwards, Toure penned a two-year scholarship contract with the club. He continued his scoring form in Adelaide's Round of 16 clash against Olympic FC, with a first-half brace helping Adelaide to a 3–2 win.  He scored again in the quarter-finals, pouncing on a Glen Moss error to score his fourth in three games as they beat the Newcastle Jets 1–0. On 23 October 2019, Toure scored the opening goal in Adelaide's 4–0 win over Melbourne City in the 2019 FFA Cup Final, being awarded the Mark Viduka Medal for his performance.

Toure scored his first A-League goal in a Round 1 clash against Sydney FC, slotting home Adelaide's second as they lost 3–2 at Coopers Stadium.

International career

Toure is eligible to represent Guinea, Liberia, and Australia. He was chosen in November 2019 to play for the Australian U23's in a friendly tournament in China, and scored on debut. Toure played a big part in helping the Olyroos qualify for the Olympics for the first time in 12 years, scoring a crucial goal against Syria in the Quarter Finals of the 2020 AFC U-23 Championship whilst going on to win the game and eventually going on to qualify a few days later in the 3rd Place Final.

Personal life
Toure was born in Guinea to Liberian parents. He migrated to Australia at the age of 4 years and six months.  He has two younger brothers – Mohamed and Musa, who both are professional footballers.

Career statistics

Honours

Club
Adelaide United
 FFA Cup: 2019

Macarthur
 Australia Cup: 2022

Individual
 Mark Viduka Medal: 2019

References

External links

2000 births
Living people
Sportspeople from Conakry
Australian soccer players
Australia youth international soccer players
Liberian footballers
Australian people of Liberian descent
Sportspeople of Liberian descent
Liberian emigrants to Australia
Naturalised citizens of Australia
Association football forwards
Croydon Kings players
Adelaide United FC players
Macarthur FC players
National Premier Leagues players
A-League Men players